The Minot Daily News is an American daily newspaper, printed in downtown Minot, North Dakota. It originated as the Burlington Reporter and was published out of Burlington, then the county seat, until the early 20th century.  It is the primary daily paper for Ward County, as well as north central and northwest North Dakota, with an average daily circulation of 11,500 on weekdays.

References

External links
 

Newspapers published in North Dakota
Minot, North Dakota